Sanko is the surname of the following people:

Alina Sanko (born 1998), Russian model and beauty pageant titleholder
Anton Sanko, American music composer, orchestrator and producer
David Sanko, American politician
Erik Sanko (born 1963), American bass guitar player
Galina Sanko (1904-1981) Soviet war photojournalist
Oleg Sanko (born 1970), Russian footballer
Olga Sanko (born 1978), Russian handball player

See also
Sankoh (surname)